Methylamphetamine may refer to:

Phentermine, α-methylamphetamine
2-Phenyl-3-aminobutane, β-methylamphetamine
Methamphetamine, N-methylamphetamine
Methamphetamine hydrochloride, "crystal meth"
Ortetamine, 2-methylamphetamine
3-Methylamphetamine
4-Methylamphetamine